Rashid Zadran is an Afghan cricketer. He made his List A debut for Speen Ghar Region in the 2017 Ghazi Amanullah Khan Regional One Day Tournament on 10 August 2017. He made his first-class debut for Mis Ainak Region in the 2017–18 Ahmad Shah Abdali 4-day Tournament on 20 October 2017. In the second innings, he was given out obstructing the field.

References

External links
 

Year of birth missing (living people)
Living people
Afghan cricketers
Mis Ainak Knights cricketers
Spin Ghar Tigers cricketers
Place of birth missing (living people)
Wicket-keepers